A Simorgh or Simurgh is a mythical flying creature of Persia.

Simorgh may also refer to:
 The Simurgh, a monstrous creature in the web serial Worm
 Simorq (car), a hybrid car designed and produced in Iran
 Simorgh (aircraft), a HESA-built two-seat Northrop F-5
 Simorgh (rocket), an Iranian expendable small-capacity orbital carrier rocket
 Samak, South Khorasan or Simorgh, a village in South Khorasan Province, Iran

See also
 Simorgh Alborz F.C., a football team in Afghanistan